London Mutual may refer to:

London Mutual Credit Union, a savings and loans co-operative, based in Peckham
The Royal London Mutual Insurance Society, trading as Royal London Group

See also